Get Lit — Words Ignite is a Los Angeles-based education nonprofit founded in 2006 by author and educator Diane Luby Lane, to increase literacy, empower youth, and energize communities through poetry and visual media. The organization aims to transform the lives of young people worldwide through classic and spoken word poetry. Through the use of specialized curriculums, the program engages young people by providing a creative outlet, community, and real-life work experience.

History 

Get Lit – Words Ignite was founded in 2006 in Los Angeles by Diane Luby Lane to increase literacy, empower youth, and energize communities through poetry. The inspiration for Get Lit began with a solo show that Ms. Lane toured with internationally celebrated poet and advocate Jimmy Santiago Baca in venues ranging from high schools and universities to prisons. Teachers and teens responded with enthusiastic requests for poetry in their classrooms. Lane then developed a curriculum through which she saw the most reluctant youth, some on the brink of dropping out, transform into poets, leaders, and scholars. To sustain this transformative work, Lane founded Get Lit first as a project of Community Partners, then in 2009 the organization incorporated as a 501(c)(3). Through her vision, Get Lit has become a respected and innovative leader in arts and education with a reputation for integrity in program implementation and effectiveness.

Activities 
Every year since 2012, Get Lit has hosted a 3-day Classic Slam poetry competition for students to compete by performing classic poems alongside their own spoken word responses. In 2020 and 2021 the Classic Slam was online. In 2020, 240 students competed and it was watched by 34,630 people via livestream. The event was covered by KCRW's radio program, "Greater L.A."and LAUSD's Teachers Gone Virtual podcast.

In 2022, the documentary film "Our Words Collide" featuring five poets from the Get Lit program premiered at the Santa Barbara International Film Festival. The film received the ADL Stand Up Award at the festival and gives a personal and timely view into how transformative the Get Lit program can be for young people, especially during the pandemic.  The ADL Stand Up Award is awarded to one film that exemplifies the impact storytelling can have on fostering mutual understanding and respect consistent with ADL's mission to secure "justice and fair treatment to all."

In January 2022, it was announced that Get Lit partnered with the Writers Guild Foundation on a youth screenwriting program that will support a new generation of diverse storytellers to have 1:1 mentoring from some of today's top film and tv writers. The two-year program will allow participants to create a final script that can be pitched, optioned, produced, or used as a sample piece to acquire representation or employment.

In May 2022, Get Lit founder, Diane Luby Lane and two Get Lit poets were featured on The Kelly Clarkson Show.

Through a partnership with the California State Library, in 2020-21 Get Lit published 120 books by youth poets with The Los Angeles Press, Alegria Magazine (Latinx writers), and Stone Soup Community Press. In 2020 and 2021 in collaboration with the Los Angeles County Department of Mental Health and We Rise LA, Get Lit launched Why I Rise, an onlinepoetry contest to share stories, cultivate community, and destigmatize mental health. In 2020, 253 videos were submitted. There were 105,000 views and 33,000 votes cast. Participants came from across the United States as well as Kenya,Tanzania, Nigeria, Canada, Pakistan, India, Philippines, the UK, Qatar, India, Botswana, Malaysia, Belgium, Trinidad and Tobago, Kuwait, and more. 1n 2021 Get Lit created video campaigns promoting voting and knowledge of civics for the social justice organization Sankofa, founded by Gina Belafonte.

In 2018, the Get Lit Players were designated Peace Day Ambassadors by the United Nations and performed their poetry for world leaders at the U.N. 73rd General Assembly as part of the global movement "United Voices for Peace." The poetry and art magazine" they created for this event was distributed to 15,000 youth throughout the U.S. through a partnership with TOMS Shoes.

In March 2018, Get Lit poets' pre-recorded videos were broadcast nationally for the March For Our Lives rally in Washington, D.C., opening for presenters including Lin-Manuel Miranda and Emma Gonzales. Get Lit's youth poets have performed at premier venues such as the Kennedy Center, Lincoln Center, the Hollywood Bowl, and The White House. Second only to Amanda Gorman, Get Lit youth are the most watched poets on the internet with over 350 million views combined.

In 2016 Diane Luby Lane and 19 Get Lit Poets created the book Get Lit Rising, published by Beyond Words & Simon and Schuster, that won the Nautilus Award for books that uplift the world.

27 Get Lit Poets wrote and starred in the feature film Summertime, directed by Carlos Lopez Estrada, which premiered at Sundance in 2020. It was released to theaters across the United States, summer 2021.

See also 
 Arts in education
 Poetry slam
 Spoken word

References

External links 
 Get Lit official website
 Diane Luby Lane's website

2006 establishments in California